Atresia is a condition in which an orifice or passage in the body is (usually abnormally) closed or absent.

Examples of atresia include:
Aural atresia, a congenital deformity where the ear canal is underdeveloped.
 Biliary atresia, a condition in newborns in which the common bile duct between the liver and the small intestine is blocked or absent.
 Congenital bronchial atresia, a rare congenital abnormality
 Choanal atresia, blockage of the back of the nasal passage, usually by abnormal bony or soft tissue.
 Esophageal atresia, which affects the alimentary tract and causes the esophagus to end before connecting normally to the stomach.
Follicular atresia, degeneration and resorption of the ovarian follicles.  
 Imperforate anus, malformation of the opening between the rectum and anus.
 Intestinal atresia, malformation of the intestine, usually resulting from a vascular accident in utero.
 Microtia, absence of the ear canal or failure of the canal to be tubular or fully formed (can be related to Microtia, a congenital deformity of the pinna, or outer ear).
 Ovarian follicle atresia, the degeneration and subsequent resorption of one or more immature ovarian follicles.
 Potter sequence, congenital decreased size of the kidney leading to absolutely no functionality of the kidney, usually related to a single kidney.
 Pulmonary atresia, malformation of the pulmonary valve in which the valve orifice fails to develop.
 Renal agenesis, only having one kidney.
 Tricuspid atresia, a form of congenital heart disease whereby there is a complete absence of the tricuspid valve, and consequently an absence of the right atrioventricular connection.
 Vaginal atresia, a congenital occlusion of the vagina or subsequent adhesion of the walls of the vagina, resulting in its occlusion.

References

Medical terminology
Anatomy